This is a list of Members of Parliament (MPs) elected to the Assembly of the Republic for the 7th Parliament of the Turkish Republic of Northern Cyprus at the 2009 parliamentary election.

The list below indicates the MPs in the parties in which they were elected; any change of political party is indicated separately.

Lefkoşa

Gazimağusa

Girne

Güzelyurt

İskele

References 

Members of the Assembly of the Republic (Northern Cyprus)